Sewa is a genus of moths belonging to the subfamily Drepaninae. The genus was first described by Swinhoe in 1900.

Species
Sewa orbiferata (Walker, 1862)
Sewa taiwana (Wileman, 1911)

References

Drepaninae
Drepanidae genera